A van der Corput sequence is an example of the simplest one-dimensional  low-discrepancy sequence over the unit interval; it was first described in 1935 by the Dutch mathematician J. G. van der Corput.  It is constructed by reversing the base-n representation of the sequence of natural numbers (1, 2, 3, …).

The -ary representation of the positive integer  is

where  is the base in which the number  is represented, and  that is, the -th digit in the -ary expansion of 
The -th number in the van der Corput sequence is

Examples

For example, to get the decimal van der Corput sequence, we start by dividing the numbers 1 to 9 in tenths, then we change the denominator to 100 to begin dividing in hundredths. In terms of numerator, we begin with all two-digit numbers from 10 to 99, but in backwards order of digits. Consequently, we will get the numerators grouped by the end digit. Firstly, all two-digit numerators that end with 1, so the next numerators are 01, 11, 21, 31, 41, 51, 61, 71, 81, 91. Then the numerators ending with 2, so they are 02, 12, 22, 32, 42, 52, 62, 72, 82, 92. And after that, the numerators ending in 3: 03, 13, 23 and so on...

Thus, the sequence begins

or in decimal representation:

0.1, 0.2, 0.3, 0.4, 0.5, 0.6, 0.7, 0.8, 0.9, 0.01, 0.11, 0.21, 0.31, 0.41, 0.51, 0.61, 0.71, 0.81, 0.91, 0.02, 0.12, 0.22, 0.32, …,

The same can be done for the binary numeral system, and the binary van der Corput sequence is

0.12, 0.012, 0.112, 0.0012, 0.1012, 0.0112, 0.1112, 0.00012, 0.10012, 0.01012, 0.11012, 0.00112, 0.10112, 0.01112, 0.11112, …

or, equivalently,

They are also equidistributed over the unit interval.

C implementation

double corput(int n, int base){
    double q=0, bk=(double)1/base;

    while (n > 0) {
      q += (n % base)*bk;
      n /= base;
      bk /= base;
    }

    return q;
}

See also

 
 
 , a natural generalization of the van der Corput sequence to higher dimensions

References

External links

 Van der Corput sequence at MathWorld

Diophantine approximation
Low-discrepancy sequences
Sequences and series